Walter "Wally" J. Curran, Jr. (born April 24, 1951) is an American radiation oncologist specializing in the treatment of malignant brain tumors and locally advanced lung cancer. 

Until 2021, Curren served as the executive director of Winship Cancer Institute of Emory University and professor and chairman of the Department of Radiation Oncology at Emory University School of Medicine in Atlanta, Georgia. He currently serves as the global chief medical officer of GenesisCare, a provider of cancer and cardiovascular care that serves communities in 440 locations across the world.

Early life and education
Curran was born and raised in Beverly, Massachusetts. He graduated with honors from Dartmouth College in Hanover, New Hampshire and received his medical degree from the Medical College of Georgia in Augusta, Georgia. Originally interested in pediatric oncology, he became a radiation oncologist after taking an open slot in a radiation oncology elective at the former Joint Center for Radiation Therapy in Boston, Massachusetts. He completed his residency in the Department of Radiation Therapy at the University of Pennsylvania Medical Center and his internship in internal medicine at Presbyterian University of Pennsylvania Medical Center in Philadelphia, Pennsylvania.

Career
Prior to joining GenesisCare in 2021, Curran was the executive director of Winship Cancer Institute of Emory University and professor and chairman of the Department of Radiation Oncology at Emory University School of Medicine in Atlanta, Georgia. He also served as a group chairman and a principal investigator of NRG Oncology, an international cancer clinical trials network group funded by the National Cancer Institute. Previously, Curran was professor and chairman of the Department of Radiation Oncology at Thomas Jefferson University in Philadelphia, Pennsylvania and clinical director of the Kimmel Cancer Center from 1994 to 2008. When appointed executive director of Winship Cancer Institute in 2009, he became the first radiation oncologist to serve as director of a National Cancer Institute-designated cancer center. He was a member of the board of directors of the American Society of Clinical Oncology. He was also named a Georgia Research Alliance Eminent Scholar and Chair in Cancer Research in 2013. He serves as the founding secretary/treasurer of the Coalition of Cancer Cooperative Groups and a board member of the Georgia Center for Oncology Research and Education (Georgia CORE).

In 2015, former President Jimmy Carter named Curran as one of the physicians treating him for metastatic melanoma.

In his research, Curran has led several landmark clinical and translational trials and is responsible for defining a universally adopted staging system for patients with malignant glioma.

Honors and awards
Curran is a fellow of the American College of Radiology and the American Society of Clinical Oncology and has been awarded honorary memberships in the European Society of Therapeutic Radiology and Oncology and the Canadian Association of Radiation Oncology. The Blue Ridge Institute for Medical Research listed Curran among the top 20 principal investigators in terms of overall National Institutes of Health funding in 2012 and 2013, first in the state of Georgia, and first among cancer center directors. Curran received the Gold Medal Award from the American Society for Radiation Oncology in 2019.

Personal life
Curran lives in Atlanta, Georgia, with his wife, Laura Palickar, and children. An avid runner, he is an age-competitive middle distance racer.

References

External links
Profile at Google Scholar
Wally Curran on Twitter

American oncologists
Emory University faculty
Living people
Dartmouth College alumni
Cancer researchers
1951 births